Glyphipterix semisparsa is a species of sedge moth in the genus Glyphipterix. It was described by Edward Meyrick in 1917. It is found in India.

References

Moths described in 1917
Glyphipterigidae
Moths of Asia